Luca Cattaneo (born 24 July 1972) is an Italian former alpine skier who competed in the 1998 Winter Olympics where he did not win a medal.

References

External links
 

1972 births
Living people
Italian male alpine skiers
Olympic alpine skiers of Italy
Alpine skiers at the 1998 Winter Olympics
Alpine skiers of Fiamme Gialle